Released in 2002, We Are In This Alone marked The Revolution Smile's second release, but first full-length LP. Many of the tracks were later reworked and remastered for their 2003 release, Above the Noise, on Flawless Records.

Musically, the album mainly features a heavy nu metal/alternative metal sound, even occasionally using screamed vocals, as evidenced on the track "Indiana Feeling". However, the track "Gun" features a sound closer to a soft indie rock style, with the only instruments used being vocals, guitar, drum machine, and synth strings. This style is also included on the track "I Wish I" (although the reworked version found on "Above The Noise" does not contain the synth strings found on the original version).

The musical style on the album has been compared to that of Deftones and Chevelle.

Track listing
 "The Gift" - 4:01
 "Payday" - 4:15
 "New Light" - 3:29
 "Indiana Feeling" - 3:01
 "Gun" - 3:47
 "The Future of an End" - 6:37
 "Cadillac Ass" - 3:50
 "Looking Down the Barrel" - 3:38
 "Ready for the World" - 4:34
 "Orange" - 8:55
 "I Wish I" - 5:15

Personnel
 Shaun Lopez - vocals, rhythm guitar
 Tim McCord - lead guitar
 Octavio Gallardo - bass guitar
 Jeremy White - drums

2002 albums
The Revolution Smile albums